Callimachus was an architect and sculptor working in the second half of the 5th century BC in the manner established by Polyclitus. He was credited with work in both Athens and Corinth and was probably from one of the two cities.  According to Vitruvius (iv.1), for his great ingenuity and taste the Athenians dubbed Callimachus katatêxitechnos (literally, 'finding fault with one's own craftsmanship': perfectionist).  His reputation in the 2nd century AD was reported in an aside by Pausanias as one "although not of the first rank of artists, was yet of unparalleled cleverness, so that he was the first to drill holes through stones"—that is, in order to enhance surface effects of light and shade in locks of hair, foliage and other details. Thus it is reported that Callimachus was known for his penchant for elaborately detailed sculptures or drapery, though few securely attributed works by him survive.

Sculpture

Callimachus is credited with the sculptures of Nikes on the frieze of the Temple of Athena Nike ("Athena, Bringer of Victory") , by the Propylaea of the Acropolis of Athens.  The small temple was commissioned by Pericles shortly before his death in 429, and built ca 427– 410.  Pliny mentions his Laconian Dancers. Six ecstatic Maenads attributed to him exist in Roman copies.

The clinging draperies of the above works has led to the original of the Venus Genetrix type (whose draperies are similarly clinging) being also attributed to him.

Architecture

Callimachus is credited with inventing the Corinthian capital, which Roman architects erected into one of the Classical orders.
The attribution comes from Vitruvius's De architectura:
  

  
In the cella of the Erechtheion hung an ingenious golden lamp called asbestos lychnis invented by Callimachus, according to Pausanias' Description of Greece: it needed to be refilled with oil only once a year as the asbestos wick did not burn. Above it hung a bronze palm branch which trapped any rising smoke. 

An inscription from Aigai of the late 5th century BC may be attributed to some work of Callimachus and the time when Archelaus invited artists to Macedon.

Ancient sources
Pausanias, (I.xxvi.6-7); Vitruvius (IV.1.9-10); Pliny the Elder, Natural History XXXIV.xix.32)

Notes

External links

 
Vitruvius Pollio, The Ten Books on Architecture, Book IV Chapter 1 from the Perseus Project.
Alleskunst.Net: Kallimachos (in English)
Smith-Platner
Andrew Stewart One Hundred Greek Sculptors: Their Careers and Extant Works: "Attic Sculptors in the Peloponnesian War"

5th-century BC Greek sculptors
Ancient Greek sculptors
Ancient Greek architects
Ancient Corinthians
Ancient Athenian sculptors
Artists of Archelaus I of Macedon